Chaenostoma boscii is a species of crab in the family Macrophthalmidae. It was described by Audouin in 1826.

References

Ocypodoidea
Crustaceans described in 1826